Vieno Johannes Sukselainen's second cabinet was the 45th government of Republic of Finland. Cabinet's time period was from January 13, 1959, to August 14, 1961. It was a minority government.

References

External links

1959 establishments in Finland
1961 disestablishments in Finland
Sukselainen, 2
Cabinets established in 1959
Cabinets disestablished in 1961